The db ligature, ȸ, is a typographic ligature of Latin d and b, and used in Africanist linguistics for the transcription of certain African languages to represent , for example in the Zulu sequence . ȸ was added to Unicode 4.1 in 2005, as U+0238 LATIN SMALL LETTER DB DIGRAPH. , only a handful of fonts can display the character. These include Charis SIL, Code2000, Comic Sans, Doulos SIL, Ubuntu, and DejaVu fonts.

See also
 ȹ

References

External links

 Unicode Character 'LATIN SMALL LETTER DB DIGRAPH' (U+0238)

DB
DB